Lee Jordan may refer to:
 Lee Jordan (Harry Potter), fictional character in Harry Potter
Lee Roy Jordan (born 1941), American football player